Bina Railway Colony is a census town in Sagar District of state of Madhya Pradesh in India.

Demographics
 India census, Bina Railway Colony had a population of 7,219. Males constitute 53% of the population and females 47%. Bina Railway Colony has an average literacy rate of 82%, higher than the national average of 73%; with male literacy of 88% and female literacy of 75%. 9% of the population is under 6 years of age.

See also 

 Bina Junction railway station

References

Sagar, Madhya Pradesh
Cities and towns in Sagar district
Railway Colonies in India